Adventure Gaming was a consumer magazine published by Manzakk Publishing, Inc. covering all aspects of the burgeoning gaming industry.  It ran for 13 issues starting in July 1981. The magazine ceased publication in 1982.

History and profile
Tim Kask departed from TSR after finishing his run with The Dragon #36 (April 1980) to work on a magazine of his own, Adventure Gaming (1980–1982); according to Shannon Appelcline, "His new venture was more generalist than The Dragon, but otherwise looked a lot like Kask's first magazine with an emphasis on (generic) FRPs, Traveller, and wargaming.

Adventure Gaming was launched in 1981. The founding and continuing editor of Adventure Gaming was Tim Kask, long of TSR and founding editor of The Dragon. Adventure Gaming was based in Norwood, Ohio. 

Adventure Gaming took an editorial stance squarely in the middle between the booming FRP (fantasy role-playing) segment of the industry, and the traditional board and miniatures gaming segments. The magazine closed in 1982 with total 13 issues.

Reception
W. G. Armintrout reviewed Adventure Gaming in The Space Gamer No. 45. Armintrout commented that "As of now, Adventure Gaming is a colorless publication that hasn't gotten itself off the ground. The only reason for subscribing would be if you have a personal motive for helping an all-hobby magazine survey. I don't recommend it."

Reviews
Pegasus #3 (1981)

References

1981 establishments in Ohio
1982 disestablishments in Ohio
Magazines established in 1981
Magazines disestablished in 1982
Magazines published in Cincinnati
Role-playing game magazines